The Edwin and Jennie Gutknecht House is located in De Pere, Wisconsin.

History
Edwin Gutknecht was employed by the C. A. Lawton Company as a salesman. The house was added to the State Register of Historic Places in 2014 and to the National Register of Historic Places the following year.

References

Houses on the National Register of Historic Places in Wisconsin
National Register of Historic Places in Brown County, Wisconsin
Houses in Brown County, Wisconsin
American Foursquare architecture
Houses completed in 1913